The Church of la Natividad de Nuestra Señora (Spanish: Iglesia Parroquial de la Natividad de Nuestra Señora) is a church located in Valdetorres de Jarama, Spain. It was declared Bien de Interés Cultural in 1996.

References 

Nuestra Senora, Valdetorres De Jarama
Bien de Interés Cultural landmarks in the Community of Madrid